Swedish Wedding Night is a 1964 Swedish drama film directed by Åke Falck. The film won the Guldbagge Award for Best Film and Jarl Kulle won the award for Best Actor at the 2nd Guldbagge Awards.

Cast
 Jarl Kulle as Hilmer Westlund
 Christina Schollin as Hildur Palm
 Edvin Adolphson as Victor Palm
 Isa Quensel as Hilma Palm
 Lars Ekborg as Simon Simonsson
 Lena Hansson as Siri Westlund
 Catrin Westerlund as Irma Palm
 Margaretha Krook as Mary
 Tor Isedal as Rudolf Palm
 Lars Passgård as Martin

References

External links

1964 films
1964 drama films
Swedish drama films
1960s Swedish-language films
Swedish black-and-white films
Best Film Guldbagge Award winners
1960s Swedish films